Prak Mony Udom (born 24 March 1994) is a Cambodian professional footballer who plays as a forward for Preah Khan Reach Svay Rieng FC of the Cambodian League and the Cambodian national football team.

He became the third Cambodian forward to be released in the Malaysia Super League May transfer window in 2018, reported in a FOX Sports Asia article.

International goals
As of match played 20 November 2018. Cambodia score listed first, score column indicates score after each Prak Mony goal.

Honours

Club
Svay Rieng
Cambodian League: 2013
Hun Sen Cup: 2011, 2012, 2015, 2017

Individual
Hun Sen Cup Golden Boot: 2015
FFC Best Player of The Year: 2017

References

 28th SEA games 2015, Retrieved June 13, 2015

External links
 

1994 births
Living people
Cambodian footballers
Cambodia international footballers
Preah Khan Reach Svay Rieng FC players
Sportspeople from Phnom Penh
Association football midfielders